Crook County High School is a public high school in Prineville, Oregon, United States. The school is ranked 88th in the state of Oregon by U.S News & World Report.

Academics
In 2008, 91% of the school's seniors received their high school diploma. Of 215 students, 196 graduated, 12 dropped out, 1 received a modified diploma, and 6 are still in high school. In 2021, the graduation rate was 98%.

History 
In 2014, Facebook donated a $105,000 Local Community Action Grant to Crook county schools. Facebook provided funding and donated servers to the school for a Data center infrastructure management program. Facebook has a large datacenter in Prineville. $10,000 of the total amount was shared between Crook County High School and Central Oregon Community College Prineville Campus.

Athletics

Team Sports and Activities

Football 
The Crook County Cowboys are the American Football team at Crook County High School in Prineville, Oregon. The Cowboys compete in the 4A Special District 2 Football Conference in Central Oregon. In 2021, Crook County hired Pard Smith as the new head football coach. Crook County is noted by The Oregonian as one of the 25 most dominant teams in Oregon high school football history.

First Football Game Played in Central Oregon 
The first high school football game played in Central Oregon was played between Crook County and Bend High on Thanksgiving Day, 1910. The football team from Bend traveled to Prineville by horse and carriage through Powell Butte. The final score is still disputed, but both newspapers in Prineville and Bend reported Crook County winning by at least two touchdowns.

Team Record

Playoff Appearances

Championships

Awards

Notable alumni 
Darrel Aschbacher played for Crook County and was a member of the 1952 football state championship team.

References

High schools in Crook County, Oregon
Prineville, Oregon
Public high schools in Oregon